Lyman Beecher Kellogg (September 28, 1841 – October 8, 1918) was the first president, as well as the first teacher, of Kansas State Normal (KSN), now known as Emporia State University, in Emporia, Kansas, United States. After serving as KSN's president, Kellogg went on to become an attorney, state representative and senator, and the Kansas Attorney General.

Biography

Early life
Kellogg was born to Hiram Kellogg and Delia Rose Beecher. Soon after his birth, his family moved to Bloomington, Illinois, where he attended the State Normal University, graduating in June 1865. In January 1865, Kellogg was appointed as Kansas State Normal's first president.

Kansas State Normal presidency
After being named president of the newly established normal school in Kansas, Kellogg's first class, which consisted of only 18 students, opened with the "Lord's Prayer" on February 15, 1865. Because funding, facilities, and teaching materials were limited, Kellogg was the sole teacher, besides being the president. In August 1865, he added Henry Brace Norton, who graduated from Illinois Normal University, as a faculty member.

Political career
In June 1871, Kellogg left the Normal School and moved to Arkansas City, Kansas. While there, Kellogg turned to practicing law and later returned to Emporia in April 1875 to continue practicing law. After returning to Emporia, he served as a State Representative 1877 to 1879. After the state legislature, he was a Lyon County probate judge from 1879 to 1885, and returned to the legislature as a state senator from 1885 to 1889. After being a state senator for four years, Kellogg won election for Attorney General as a Republican, serving from January 14, 1889 to January 12, 1891.

Personal life
While at Kansas State Normal, Kellogg married Abigail "Abbie" Homer, with whom he had two children, Vernon Lyman and Fred Homer. After moving to Arkansas City in 1871, Abbie became ill and died of tuberculosis in 1873. Five years later, Kellogg married Mary Virginia Mitchell, mostly known as Jennie Mitchell Kellogg, with whom he had three children, Charles Mitchell (1879), Mary Virginia (1883), and Joseph Mitchell (1885). Jennie was Deputy Kansas Attorney General under Kellogg.

References

External links
 

Presidents of Emporia State University
Emporia State University faculty
Illinois State University alumni
People from Lorain County, Ohio
1841 births
1911 deaths
Kansas Republicans